Keith Bell may refer to:

 Keith Bell (rugby union) (born 1948), former rugby union player who represented Australia
 Keith Bell (rugby league, born 1934), rugby league player of the 1950s for New Zealand, Auckland, and Ponsonby
 Keith Bell (rugby league, born 1953), English rugby league player of the 1970s, 1980s and 1990s
 Keith Bell (politician) (born 1962), American politician and member of Texas House of Representatives